Chesias rufata, the broom-tip, is a moth of the family Geometridae. It was described by Johan Christian Fabricius in 1775. It has a wide range in central and western Europe, including Great Britain and Ireland. It is also found from Morocco to Asia Minor.The species prefers heaths, bushy slopes and rocky valleys which favour its foodplants. It is found up to 1,500m in the Alps.

The approximately oval-shaped wings are typical. The basal area of the forewing is silver. There is a very distinct reddish-brown cross band. Some specimens show a grey basal area and very wide reddish-brown areas on either side of the midfield. Others show a black mark on the upper part of the second cross line of the forewings following the mark is a reddish or ochreous flush, extending to the tips of the wings. A dark dividing line is located at the apex. A wavy whitish stands near the margin. The hindwings are unpatterned ochre grey in colour. Prout describes the most frequent varieties.
The egg is rather small, oval, slightly broadened and deepened at the micropylar end; the surface faintly pitted. The colour is delicate
orange, approaching salmon-colour. The larva is closely similar to that of  legatella but the subdorsal line is edged with
darker green  and the spiracles are black. 

The larvae feed on Cytisus scoparius, Genista tinctoria and Genista germanica. The larvae feed at night and are then rather conspicuous, as they have a habit of stretching out from the plant at full length. They may be found from June to September. Adults are on wing from April to May. Normally, there is one generation per year. However, a second generation may occur with adults on wing from June to August and the moth is very erratic in its time of emerging which — at least in some seasons and in some localities. Adults have been recorded feeding on nectar from the flowers of Salix and Berberis species.

Subspecies
 Chesias rufata rufata
 Chesias rufata cinereata Staudinger, 1901
 Chesias rufata obliquaria Denis & Schiffermüller, 1775
 Chesias rufata occidentalis Delahaye, 1900
 Chesias rufata ornata Heydemann, 1933
 Chesias rufata plumbeata Staudinger, 1901 (Morocco)
 Chesias rufata pinkeri Schawerda, 1939
 Chesias rufata scotica Richardson, 1952

Etymology
The scientific name of the species derives from the Latin rufus meaning "red".

References

External links

"70.196 BF1865 Broom-tip Chesias rufata (Fabricius, 1775)". UKMoths. Retrieved March 13, 2018.
Lepidoptera of Belgium
Lepiforum.de

rufata
Moths described in 1775
Moths of Europe
Moths of Asia
Taxa named by Johan Christian Fabricius